British Army Training Support Unit Belize (BATSUB), the successor of the former British Forces Belize, is the name given to the current British Army Garrison in Belize. The garrison is used primarily for jungle warfare training, with access to over 5,000 square miles of jungle terrain, provided by the Government of Belize.

BATSUB is located near Belize International Airport, at Price Barracks, Ladyville.

History
In 2010, the UK government announced it would mothball the facility as part of its Strategic Defence and Security Review. However, in 2015, reports indicated that BATSUB was seeing "increased usage". In November 2015, the UK government announced it was re-establishing the facility as part of its 2015 Strategic Defence and Security Review. According to some Belizean media reports, the British decision to re-establish BATSUB could have been linked to rising tensions between Belize and Guatemala.

Under the Integrated Review paper announced by the UK Government in March 2021, Belize is to become a 'land hub', and could have personnel deployed more regularly and for longer durations.  The unit is currently commanded by a lieutenant colonel.

British Forces Belize

The British Army Training Support Unit Belize (BATSUB) is a successor to British Forces Belize, which was structured as such in 1989:
British Army Forces in Belize
1st Battalion, Welsh Guards, on six month roulement.
1 x Armoured Reconnaissance Troop, six month roulement.
1 x Field Battery, Royal Artillery, six month roulement.
1 x Field Squadron, Royal Engineers, six month roulement.
24th Squadron, Royal Corps of Transport.
78th Ordnance Company, Royal Army Ordnance Corps.
No. 25 Flight, Army Air Corps.
Royal Navy Forces – Belize:
West Indies Guard Ship, as needed.
Royal Air Force – Belize:
No. 1417 Flight RAF
No. 1563 Flight RAF
1 Air Defence Troop, RAF Regiment, six month roulement.

See also 
 Belize–United Kingdom relations
 Overseas military bases of the United Kingdom

References

Further reading 
Isby and Kamps, Armies of NATO's Central Front, Jane's Publishing Company, 1985

External links 
 

British Army deployments
Military of Belize
Royal Air Force education and training
Belize–United Kingdom military relations
Military installations of the United Kingdom in other countries
Belize and the Commonwealth of Nations
United Kingdom and the Commonwealth of Nations